Under Cover (also known as Fires Within) is a 1987 film directed by John Stockwell (in his directorial debut) and starring David Neidorf and Jennifer Jason Leigh.

Premise

A cop goes undercover in a South Carolina high school. With the help of a local narcotics officer, he investigates the drug ring responsible for another cop's death.

Cast
David Neidorf as Sheffield
Jennifer Jason Leigh as Tanille Lareoux
Piper Cochrane as Becky
Barry Corbin as Sergeant Irwin Lee
David Denney as Hassie Pearl
Kathleen Wilhoite as Corrinne Armour

References

External links

1987 films
1987 crime drama films
1980s high school films
American crime drama films
1987 directorial debut films
Films directed by John Stockwell
Golan-Globus films
Films about the illegal drug trade
Films produced by Menahem Golan
Films set in South Carolina
Films with screenplays by Menahem Golan
Films produced by Yoram Globus
1980s English-language films
1980s American films